The Vicenç Ros Municipal Museum, in Martorell (Baix Llobregat), occupies one of the sections of an old Capuchin convent dating back to the 17th century and is part of Barcelona Provincial Council Local Museum Network. Opened in 1945, the museum came to be thanks to Vicenç Ros i Batllevell (1883–1970), who donated his large ceramics collection. Over the years, the museum has organised its collection into different categories, which it has expanded: ethnology, art, archaeology, architecture and archives.

The collection
The museum collection is made up of different smaller collections, of which ceramics, architectural and sculptural elements, ethnology and art are of particular note.
The ceramics collection is the most extensive, with 350 pieces of ceramics of varying origins and styles and almost 15,000 tiles.

See also
 L'Enrajolada, Santacana House-Museum. Martorell

References

External links
 Local Museum Network site

Barcelona Provincial Council Local Museum Network
Buildings and structures in Baix Llobregat
Ceramics museums
Art museums established in 1945
1945 establishments in Spain
Decorative arts museums in Spain